Dželaludin Muharemović (born 23 March 1970) is a Bosnian professional football manager and former player who is the current manager of Chinese club Guangxi Pingguo Haliao.

Club career
As a kid, Muharemović started playing football for his hometown club Željezničar. He was considered to be one of the biggest prospects in the club and when he had reached the senior squad, he was sent on loan to UNIS Vogošća.

In 1992, war in Bosnia and Herzegovina began and every football activity was stopped. However, the club was reestablished soon and Muharemović played in the first Bosnian championship in 1994. After that, he moved to Croatian side Zagreb.

One year later, he returned to Željezničar and in a course of ten seasons he played more than 300 official games for the club, scoring 127 goals.

In the winter of 2001, Muharemović moved to rich Russian second division club Volgar Astrahan. He stayed there less than a year, as he returned to Željezničar in autumn.

In the spring of 2005, he declared that he was retiring from football. Muharemović played in 172 league games for Željezničar, scoring 112 league goals in the process, a club record. He is also the joint highest goalscorer in the history of the club, alongside Josip Bukal, scoring 127 goals in all competitions.

International career
Muharemović made his debut for the Bosnia and Herzegovina national team on 22 February 1997 in a Dunhill Cup game against Vietnam (Bosnia won 4–0). He also scored a brace at the LG Cup 2001 vs South Africa. He has earned a total of 19 caps, scoring 6 goals. Three games (4 goals) were unofficial. His final international was an October 2001 FIFA World Cup qualification match against Liechtenstein.

Managerial career
After retirement, Željezničar's club chairman at the time offered Muharemović the position of sporting director. He accepted the offer, but after manager Nenad Starovlah was sacked in September 2006, he temporary took over his position as a replacement.

For a short period in 2015, he was manager of Velež Mostar.

On 11 April 2018, Muharemović became the new manager of Chinese club Dalian Transcendence, where he worked as an assistant manager with Rusmir Cviko previously.

On 10 February 2019, after Dalian Transcendence decided to quit the professional league in China, he moved to a nearby team Dalian Chanjoy in the China League Two. He left Dalian in December 2019.

Career statistics

International goals

Managerial statistics

Honours

Player
Željezničar 
Bosnian Premier League: 1997–98, 2000–01, 2001–02
Bosnian Cup: 1999–00, 2000–01, 2002–03
Bosnian Supercup: 1998, 2000, 2001

Individual
Performance
Bosnian Premier League Top Goalscorer: 2000–01 (31 goals)

References

External links
Dželaludin Muharemović at Soccerway

1970 births
Living people
Footballers from Sarajevo
Bosniaks of Bosnia and Herzegovina
Association football midfielders
Yugoslav footballers
Bosnia and Herzegovina footballers
Bosnia and Herzegovina international footballers
FK Željezničar Sarajevo players
NK Zagreb players
FC Volgar Astrakhan players
Premier League of Bosnia and Herzegovina players
Croatian Football League players
Russian First League players
Bosnia and Herzegovina expatriate footballers
Expatriate footballers in Croatia
Bosnia and Herzegovina expatriate sportspeople in Croatia
Expatriate footballers in Russia
Bosnia and Herzegovina expatriate sportspeople in Russia
Bosnia and Herzegovina football managers
FK Željezničar Sarajevo managers
FK Velež Mostar managers 
Dalian Transcendence F.C. managers
Premier League of Bosnia and Herzegovina managers
Bosnia and Herzegovina expatriate football managers
Expatriate football managers in China
Bosnia and Herzegovina expatriate sportspeople in China